Francis Bartlett Crawford (7 June 1887 – 3 July 1943) was an Australian rules footballer who played with University in the Victorian Football League (VFL).

Education
He was educated at Geelong College.

Football
He played VFL football while he studied medicine at the University of Melbourne.

Medical practitioner
Following his graduation, he worked in Launceston and Ballarat before taking over a practice in Erin St, Richmond.

Notes

References
Holmesby, Russell & Main, Jim (2007). The Encyclopedia of AFL Footballers. 7th ed. Melbourne: Bas Publishing.

External links

1887 births
1943 deaths
Australian rules footballers from Victoria (Australia)
University Football Club players
People educated at Geelong College